Dolenje is a small settlement in the Municipality of Domžale in the Upper Carniola region of Slovenia.

References

External links 

Dolenje on Geopedia

Populated places in the Municipality of Domžale